The Croatian Film Association (HFS), also known as the Croatian Film Clubs' Association, is an association of non-professional film and video groups in Croatia.

Croatian Film Association was established in 1963. Since 1992, it is a member of Union Internationale du Cinéma (UNICA). The association's president is Hrvoje Turković.

Croatian Film Association produced or co-produced a number of documentary and feature films. Notable feature films produced by the HFS include What Is a Man Without a Moustache? (2005), an award-winning comedy, and A Letter to My Father (2012), winner of the Big Golden Arena for Best Film at the Pula Film Festival.

References

External links
  

1963 establishments in Yugoslavia
Organizations established in 1963
Film organizations in Croatia